Actaea asiatica, commonly known as Asian baneberry, is a species of baneberry that ranges throughout Asia. The flowers are ranges from gray to white. The berries are black-purple. The plant is extremely poisonous to humans. The fruits are eaten by birds which disperse the seeds.

References

External links

 Actaea asiatica picture

asiatica
Flora of temperate Asia